Ghaniabad (also Romanized as Ghanīābād) is a village in Ali Jamal Rural District of the Central District of Boshruyeh County, South Khorasan province, Iran. At the 2006 National Census, its population was 1,140 in 269 households, when it was in the former Boshruyeh District of Ferdows County. The following census in 2011 counted 1,298 people in 370 households, by which time the district had been separated from the county and Boshruyeh County established. The latest census in 2016 showed a population of 1,353 people in 426 households; it was the largest village in its rural district.

References 

Boshruyeh County

Populated places in South Khorasan Province

Populated places in Boshruyeh County